Big Gay Love is a 2013 American comedy film written and directed by Ringo Le and produced by Quentin Lee and Marisa Le. The story centers on Bob (Jonathan Lisecki), an overweight gay man who overcomes discrimination and insecurity based on his looks to find love in the form of a chef named Andy (Nicholas Brendon).

The film was funded through Kickstarter and reached its goal on 23 March 2013.

Cast
 Jonathan Lisecki as Bob
 Nicholas Brendon as Andy
 Ann Walker as Betty
 Ethan Le Phong as Chase (as Phong Truong)
 Todd Stroik as Aidan
 Ken Takemoto as Mr. Tran
 Drew Droege as Dan#1
 Amy Hill as Dr. Barrenbottom
 Jason Stuart as Dan#2
 Karina Bonnefil as Billy Gene
 Jeffrey Damnit as Rambo
 Harvey Guillén as Brian
 Ina-Alice Kopp as Lana
 Jesse James Rice as Tag
 Reed Schiff as jazz pianist

Reception
Big Gay Love premiered at the Frameline Film Festival and then screened at Outfest, Philadelphia QFest, and the Palm Springs Cinema Diverse Film Festival where it was named Festival Favourite Film.

David Lewis of the San Francisco Chronicle praised Lisecki's performance, calling it "an emotionally naked performance"'.

Gary Goldstein of the Los Angeles Times considered: "There’s a sweet, funny, universal story hiding in the corners of the discombobulated comedy “Big Gay Love". Writer-director Ringo Le seems aware of his thematic intentions, but he's fuzzy on how to execute them. The result is a thin, wanly structured film that, after an OK start, stumbles about, filling time until its foregone conclusion."

References

External links
 Big Gay Love at the Internet Movie Database
 Big Gay Love on Facebook
 Big Gay Love on Twitter

2013 comedy films
2013 LGBT-related films
American comedy films
American LGBT-related films
LGBT-related comedy films
2013 films
Gay-related films
2010s English-language films
2010s American films